Ives is both a surname and a given name. Notable people with the name include:

Surname:
 Alice Emma Ives (1876–1930), American dramatist, journalist
 Burl Ives (1909–1995), American singer, author and actor
 Charles Ives (1874–1954), American composer
 Charles Ives (footballer) (1907–1942), football player from New Zealand
 Chauncey Ives (1810–1894), American sculptor in Italy
 Clarrie Ives (1890–1956), Australian rugby league footballer
 Clay Ives (born 1972), Canadian-born American luger
 David Ives (born 1950), contemporary American playwright
 Dick Ives (1926–1997), American basketball player
 Edward D. Ives (1925–2009), American folklorist
 Edward Ives (toymaker) (1839–1918), U.S. toymaker
 Edward Ives (rower) (born 1961), American Olympic oarsman
 Edward H. Ives (1819–1892), Wisconsin politician
 Eric Ives (1931–2012), English historian
 Eugene S. Ives (1859–1917), New York and Arizona politician
 F. Badger Ives (1858–1914), Wisconsin politician
 Florence Carpenter Ives (1854–1900), American journalist
 Frederic Eugene Ives (1856–1937), photography and halftoning pioneer
 George Cecil Ives (1867–1950), poet, writer, penal reformer and early gay rights campaigner
 George Frederick Ives (1881–1993), last surviving veteran of the Boer War
 Gideon S. Ives (1846–1927), American politician
 Grayston Ives (born 1948), British composer, singer and choral director
 Greg Ives (born 1979), American NASCAR crew chief
 Halsey Ives (1847–1911), American art museum director
 Henry S. Ives ( 1862–1894), American financier
 Herbert E. Ives (1882–1953), physicist and inventor; son of Frederick Ives
 James Merritt Ives (1824–1895), American lithographer; founder of Currier and Ives
 John Ives (1751–1776), English antiquarian and officer of arms
 Joseph Christmas Ives (1829–1868), American botanist, surveyor, engineer and Confederate officer
 Joshua Ives (1854–1931), first Professor of Music at the University of Adelaide, South Australia
Norman Ives (1923–1978), American artist, professor, print publisher
 Ralph B. Ives (1873–1934), American businessman
 Thomas Ives (born 1996), American football player
 William Ives (disambiguation), several people

Given name:
 Ives Antero De Souza (born 1985), Brazilian football (soccer) player
 Ives Roqueta (1936–2015), Occitan author
 Ivo of Ramsey (before 1000), Cornish saint
 Ivo of Chartres (1040–1115), French bishop and saint
 Ives of Kermartin (1253–1303), also known as Ivo of Kermartin, French parish priest and patron saint of Brittany, lawyers, and abandoned children
 Ives I de Belesme, 10th century Norman baron, controlling the lands and tower of Belesme

See also
 Ivo, variant
 Yves, variant
 Ives, Missouri, a community in the United States
 Currier and Ives, U.S. lithographer
 Ives Manufacturing Company, American toy manufacturer (1868–1932)
 Ives–Stilwell experiment, a test of Einstein's special relativity theory
 Ives noir, hybrid wine grape
St Ives (disambiguation)